Syzygium cormiflorum, commonly known as the bumpy satinash, is a species of Syzygium tree endemic to Queensland in northeastern Australia.

Description
Trees with flowers on branches grow larger than those with flowers on the trunk. The trunk in the latter form has a pronounced bumpy texture. Large specimens can have buttressed trunks. The bark is fibrous and flakey. The flowers appear on the trunk (cauliflory) or larger branches (ramiflory) over most months of the year except December and January, but peak over July to September.

Taxonomy
Victorian colonial botanist Ferdinand von Mueller described the bumpy satinash as Eugenia cormiflora in  1865, from a collection by John Dallachy at Dalrymple's Gap near Rockingham Bay in Queensland. It was transferred to the genus Syzygium in a revision of the genus in 1983. Eugenia hislopii, named by  Frederick Manson Bailey in 1913, is a synonym. Common names include white apple, wild apple, watergum,  Cairns satinash, and bumpy satinash.

Distribution and habitat
It is found in rainforest.

Ecology
The fruit is not particularly palatable to humans. The southern cassowary eats the fruit and flowers. The odoriferous black ant (Anonychomyrma gilberti) makes extensive tunnels in the cauliflorous form, particularly at the bumps where flowers grow.

Cultivation
Syzygium cormiflorum is rarely grown in gardens. Generally propagated from seed, it can take 8 to 12 years to flower. It can be grown in subtropical climates. 

About 40 of these trees have been planted throughout the city of Cairns in Queensland.

Gallery

References

External links
 
 
 View a map of historical sightings of this species at the Australasian Virtual Herbarium
 View observations of this species on iNaturalist
 View images of this species on Flickriver

cormiflorum
Trees of Australia
Ornamental trees
Myrtales of Australia
Endemic flora of Queensland
Plants described in 1865
Taxa named by Ferdinand von Mueller